HDT may refer to:

 HDT (data format), a data compression format
 Hardware Detection Tool, software for SYSLINUX
 Hawaii-Aleutian Daylight Time
 Heat deflection temperature, at which a polymer deforms under load
 Holden Dealer Team, a former car-racing team
 Henry David Thoreau, American transcendentalist poet